The South Semitic scripts are a family of alphabets that had split from Proto-Sinaitic script by the 10th century BC. The family has two main branches: Ancient North Arabian (ANA) and Ancient South Arabian (ASA). The scripts were exclusive to Arabia and the Horn of Africa. All the ANA and most of the ASA scripts fell out of use by the 6th century AD. The exception was Geʽez, a child of ASA in use in Ethiopia. It and its variants remain in use today for various Ethiosemitic languages. In Arabia, the South Semitic scripts were replaced by the Arabic script, which is descended from the Aramaic script.

References

Semitic writing systems